Our Heavenly Bodies (literally: Wonder of the Creation) is a 1925 German educational film written by Hanns Walter Kornblum and Ernst Krieger which attempts to represent everything known about the cosmos at the time. It covers the origin and mechanics of the Solar System, gravitation, the stars, and the nature of galaxies.

The film is a prime example of the early German "Kulturfilm", which are regarded as predecessors of the modern film documentary.
It features a large variety of special effects and animations, as well as fantastical depictions of travel around the Solar System and to the stars.  Prints were color-tinted and color-toned for effect.

The film has been reconstructed in 2008 by Munich Film Archive using material from the National Audiovisual Institute (Finland) in Helsinki and the Deutsche Kinemathek in Berlin. The current rights holder is the Friedrich-Wilhelm-Murnau Foundation.

Acts 
1) On the Road to Truth
A history of cosmology.

2) The Night Sky
The Moon: its motion and faces, its tides, lunar eclipses; the fixed stars, Berlin-Babelsberg Observatory, constellations, the North Star, comets, meteors and falling stars.

3) The Star of Day
Sunspots, auroras, solar eclipse, solar prominences, night, day and meridians, heating of the equator vs. poles, earthly seasons.

4) A Flight to the Moon
Introduces a "fantasty ship" pulled by "huge electrical energies", calls it a "space ship".  Depicts its launch, discusses the nature of the vacuum of space, the idea of a Moon-day, the Earth as seen from the Moon.

5) The Sun's Children
Continues the imaginary journey to Mercury (mentions that it's thought that Mercury always presents the same face to the Sun), Venus, Mars, its seasons and polar caps, the observed canals. Depicts an imaginary landing, and people bouncing around in reduced gravity.  Asteroids.
A depiction of Gulliver's Travels in Lilliput illustrates Jupiter's size.
The moons of Jupiter. Depicts a person labouring to crawl on the surface of Jupiter, and giants residing on Jupiter.
Saturn's rings as "numberless small bodies", depicts the rings as seen from Saturn, and Saturn's moons;
Uranus; Neptune, its discovery, and its one big moon.

6) At the Gates of Infinity
Explains that there is no up or down in space, and attempts to show people in zero gravity;
discusses nebulas.
The travellers use a flat view screen to look back on Earth, where they witness historical events.
As the ship proceeds to travel faster than light, the travellers view the same historical events in reverse.
The ship then proceeds much faster than light to visit binary stars — Algol, globular cluster. The fantasy comes to an end as they leave the last star of the Milky Way. (In 1924 it was controversial whether the Milky Way comprised the universe or not.)

7) Becoming and Waning in Outer Space
Discusses the relative movements of stars; that the shape of constellations is a matter of perspective;
a mass of gas taking a spiral disk shape, wherein knots form to become planets — in their youth as gas, forming a solid kernel — formation of (terrestrial) planets;
erosion of surface of Earth, prehistoric creatures.
Speculates on the future of the Earth — shows people freezing, then a very extended depiction of the world burning up upon being hit by another heavenly body.

Further Credits
Scientific review:
 Professor Dr. Guthnick
 Professor Dr. Kopff
 Professor Dr. Ludendorff
 Professor Dr. Solger

Constructions:
 Gustav Hennig
 Hans Minzloff
 Walter Reimann
 Karl Stahl-Urach

Film Reconstruction

 Stefan Drössler
 Christian Ketels
 Gerhard Ullmann

"Thanks to"

 Antti Alanen
 Annette Groschke
 Juha Kindberg
 Konrad und Wolfgang Kornblum
 Eva Orbanz
 Jon Wengström

Reception and legacy

The film is described as being "overwhelming", a "wild success" at the time, in contrast with the Ufa's later, better known production Metropolis.

Scenes of the film are often described as forerunners of space science-fiction films,
especially Stanley Kubrick's 2001: A Space Odyssey.
The spirit and content of the film more closely parallels that of Carl Sagan's TV series Cosmos: A Personal Voyage.

References

External links 

1925 films
German documentary films
Documentary films about outer space
Astronomy education works
Films about the Solar System
Earth in film
Moon in film
Venus in film
Mars in film
Jupiter in film
Saturn in film
Neptune in film
Space adventure films
 
Interstellar travel in fiction
German silent feature films
1925 documentary films
German black-and-white films
Silent adventure films
1920s German films